= BARCAP =

BARCAP/BarCap may refer to:

- "Barrier Combat Air Patrol" (BARCAP), a type of combat air patrol
- Barclays Capital (BarCap), the former name of the investment banking division of Barclays
